Orthetrum migratum is an Australian freshwater dragonfly species in the family Libellulidae.
The common name for this species is rosy skimmer.
It inhabits streams, boggy seepages, riverine pools and swamps across northern Australia.

Orthetrum migratum is a medium-sized dragonfly with a body that can be yellow-green or grey-brown to dark blue. The abdomen of a male is red and evenly tapered, while the abdomen of a female is coloured a yellow-green-brown.

Gallery

See also
 List of Odonata species of Australia

References

Libellulidae
Odonata of Australia
Endemic fauna of Australia
Taxa named by Maurits Anne Lieftinck
Insects described in 1951